In the mathematical field of analysis, Dini's theorem says that if a monotone sequence of continuous functions converges pointwise on a compact space and if the limit function is also continuous, then the convergence is uniform.

Formal statement
The same conclusion holds if  is monotonically decreasing instead of increasing. The theorem is named after Ulisse Dini.

This is one of the few situations in mathematics where pointwise convergence implies uniform convergence; the key is the greater control implied by the monotonicity. The limit function must be continuous, since a uniform limit of continuous functions is necessarily continuous.

Proof
Let  be given. For each , let , and let  be the set of those  such that . Each  is continuous, and so each  is open (because each  is the preimage of the open set  under , a continuous function). Since  is monotonically increasing,  is monotonically decreasing, it follows that the sequence  is ascending (i.e.  for all ). By compactness, there is a finite subcover, and since  are ascending the largest of these is a cover too. Thus we obtain that there is some positive integer  such that  .

Notes

References 

 Bartle, Robert G. and Sherbert Donald R.(2000) "Introduction to Real Analysis, Third Edition" Wiley. p 238. – Presents a proof using gauges. 

 Jost, Jürgen (2005) Postmodern Analysis, Third Edition, Springer.  See Theorem 12.1 on page 157 for the monotone increasing case.

 Rudin, Walter R. (1976) Principles of Mathematical Analysis, Third Edition, McGraw–Hill.  See Theorem 7.13 on page 150 for the monotone decreasing case.
 

Theorems in real analysis
Articles containing proofs